George Edward Doney (~1758–1809) is believed to have been born in Gambia around 1758.  He was transported to Virginia as a young boy and sold into slavery. He came to Watford, Hertfordshire in around 1765, as a servant for the Earl of Essex at Cassiobury House, continuing to serve the family for 44 years.

He achieved respect and status at Cassiobury House and was baptised at St Mary's Church, Watford on 1 August 1774. George Capel-Coningsby, 5th Earl of Essex and the Countess of Essex were among the list of subscribers to the autobiography of Olaudah Equiano, a former slave who was influential in the abolitionist movement.

Depiction in art
An unfinished painting from c.1809, 'Harvest Home', painted by J.M.W. Turner on his second visit to Cassiobury, depicts a black servant at a harvest dinner in one of the barns at Cassiobury House. Black figures have featured in many Western paintings, but were typically shown at the edge of the canvas as peripheral, subordinate characters; Turner's positioning of the servant in the main group of people is thought to indicate that this was a high-ranking servant in the Cassiobury household, and it is likely that this is Doney himself.

Death and burial
Doney died a freeman in 1809, two years after the British abolition of the Atlantic slave trade.  His burial at St Mary's Church took place on 8 September 1809 and a handsome headstone with an original poetical epigraph was erected in the churchyard. The gravestone was given Grade II listed status in 2008.

References

External links 

, George Edward Doney's involvement with the abolition movement?

Gambian emigrants to England
People from Watford
Black British former slaves
Converts to Christianity
18th-century Gambian people
Year of birth uncertain
1809 deaths
18th-century American slaves